Isabella Adinolfi (born 27 March 1978) is an Italian politician and Member of the European Parliament from Italy since 2014. She was a member of Five Star Movement, part of the Europe for Freedom and Democracy until July 2021 when she joined Forza Italia.

Biography 
She graduated in Conservation of Cultural Heritage with a thesis on the restoration of archaeological wood, subsequently obtaining a master's degree in Local Sustainable Development.

Political activity 
Adinolfi was a candidate of the Five Star Movement for the Southern Italy constituency in the 2014 European Parliament election. She won election to the European Parliament, receiving 67,477 votes.

In the 2019 European Parliament election, she was the top candidate on the party list.

References

External links 
 Board Isabella Adinolfi on the site Beppe Grillo
 

1978 births
Living people
People from Nocera Inferiore
Five Star Movement MEPs
MEPs for Italy 2014–2019
MEPs for Italy 2019–2024
21st-century women MEPs for Italy